Bear Flat is a census-designated place (CDP) in Gila County, Arizona, United States. The population as of the 2010 census was 18.

Geography

Demographics

Bear Flat first appeared on the 2010 U.S. Census as a census-designated place (CDP).

History 
Downstream from the mouth of Christopher Creek we come to the last homestead before Tonto Creek flows through a large wilderness area on its way to the Tonto Basin. The homestead is known as Bear Flat, and its settlement brings to mind the life style of the area's pioneer families. Looking in on the life of one of them we capture the flavor of pioneers under the Rim.

Bear Flat was settled by Columbus Buford Haught, the son of Henry and Sarah Bell Haught. He was born Sept. 26, 1895, during his parent's westward odyssey, and arrived in the Rim Country with them in 1897 at the age of two. How did he come by such a name as "Columbus?"

One must look back to Pennsylvania where the Haught clan originated in America, having immigrated there with William Penn from Europe. Members of the family began to spread out along the western frontier, and genealogy records show that in Illinois one couple who had been born in Pennsylvania had a son they named Christopher Columbus Haught. Since the forbears of the Arizona Haughts also lived in Illinois before moving on to Texas, and thence to Arizona, it seems that the name "Columbus Haught" had been on the family tree for some time.

Henry and Sarah Bell Haught's son was hardly ever called Columbus because it was too hard a word for the younger children. They called him "the little boy" and over the years that shortened simply to "Boy." As Boy Haught was growing up to be a cowboy school took a back seat when roundups and other ranch work summoned. He attended here and there, from time to time, along with his numerous cousins who lived up and down these same valleys.

Boy Haught served in the army during World War I, but before leaving for the war he purchased the squatter's rights to a claim owned by Ed Harris along Tonto Creek. It was called Bear Flats because prolific berry bushes along the creek made it a haven for bears. During the conflict in Europe Boy's frontier ability to shoot straight placed him as a sharp shooter in the front lines, and he was in Germany when the Armistice was signed.

Discharged May 23, 1919, he returned from the war to continue developing his land. Years later in an interview with a local educator, Ira Murphy, Boy Haught expressed pride that the family owned all the land from Little Green Valley to Tonto Creek, Thompson Draw (where the Haughts operated a saw mill), Bear Flats, and up stream to "Old Dick Williams place," the place that Henry and Boy's brother Sam had settled. "We owned all that at one time."

His statement did not include Kohl's Ranch, which was never owned by the Haughts, but it speaks of how the settlers were so isolated they just took possession of the entire forest and treated it as their own.

There was little time for social life, except when the dances took place at the schools on Tonto Creek and in Gordon Canyon. It was at a dance in the Gordon Canyon schoolhouse that Boy Haught met Flora Hunt. After that first meeting he would ride over to Gordon Canyon, where she lived with her uncle and mother at the Anderton place, and escort her to the dances. Since the dance usually lasted all night, he would escort her home the next day and then ride home to go to work. [1]

Flora and Boy Haught were married Dec. 25, 1922 at the Little Green Valley Ranch. Flora said that it was too far to ask their friends and family to come all the way to her home in Gordon Canyon, so she consented to have the wedding at the Haught place. The couple made their home at Bear Flat in the little house that already stood on the property. "It was fine for us," Flora later said. "Our first child, Columbus Junior, was born there."

Their ranch was just 2 miles east of the Henry Haught homestead in Little Green Valley. The two ranches today are still connected by Tonto Forest Road 405, and in imagination one can "return to yesteryear" while driving or hiking this historic trail. Because of his previous work on the property, the required five years for improving a homestead claim were fulfilled during their first year of marriage, and Columbus Boy Haught was able to "prove up" on it. He received a formal patent to the homestead in 1923. Boy and his brother Sam then built a new house on the Flat for his growing family, where his three other children were born. [2]

The family ran Hereford cattle, and their children enjoyed trapping wild animals, especially ringtail cats whose hides sold for $5. As was true for many of the Rim Country ranchers who had small homesteads in these canyons, Boy Haught often had to work elsewhere to support the family. In the 1930s roads were being developed in Tonto Basin and the Rim Country, and he helped to survey proposed highways through the rugged countryside. He supplied horses and pack mules along with his own expertise in knowing the lay of the land and surviving as an outdoorsman.

Flora Haught would look back in her late years and tell how very happy she and Boy were there at Bear Flat. She described their life to local author Marguerite Noble in later years, "We had to make our own fun. We had good neighbors and we got together. The whole family, young, and old, went to the dances, usually held in the schoolhouse, as the only place large enough for a group. I've danced many a mile in the Tonto schoolhouse where Horton joins Tonto Creek above Kohl's Ranch, and in the Gordon Canyon school which now has been removed to the Pioneer Arizona Living Museum on the Black Canyon Highway. We danced to fiddle and guitar music, with cornmeal on the floor to slicken it. At midnight we stopped for a potluck supper.

"The women brought all kinds of good food, meat, vegetables, cakes, and pies. Always on the stove was a pot of hot coffee. We came to dance, not to sleep, and so we danced until daylight. Then we blew out the coal oil lamps and sometimes went to a neighbor's house for breakfast. Beefsteak and hot biscuits, or bacon, eggs and hotcakes. Then we got on our horses or in the wagon to head homeward. Fourth of July was a big time for picnics. People came from miles away, from Young, Pleasant Valley, Rye, Tonto Basin, Gisela, Payson for the visiting and celebrating." [3]

Going to Payson was not something they did very often. But they would take the wagon to Winslow in the fall and load up with "all the groceries he could put on his wagon, to run us through the winter." In an interview along with Boy taken by Payson school superintendent Ira Murphy after their retirement, Flora said of those pioneer days, "That was the best part of my life, when we lived on the ranch and rode horseback every place we went. Oh, it's a wonderful life. You didn't have everything and anything that you wanted, but that was all right. You made do with what you had."

Boy Haught worked for the WPA in the 1930s when they built the Tonto Hatchery. In 1941 he was hired by the Arizona Game and Fish Department to supervise the Tonto Creek Hatchery, a position he held for 19 years until his retirement in September 1960 at age 65.

When Walt and Elaine Drorbaugh came to work at the hatchery in the 1950s, the two families became good friends. Elaine and Flora worked together caring for their families, and they told one story that became a family joke. While picking berries the two women were confronted by a large black bear. They turned and ran, only to look over their shoulders and find the bear was running in the opposite direction.

During an earlier part of their family life, when the children were in grade school, Boy and Flora had bought some property in Payson and built a small house so that the children could attend school. However, about the time they moved to the fish Hatchery that house burned down. They had another house built on that lot and after retirement moved back to town. Flora would live there until she died April 18, 2003, a few months short of her 100th birthday.

Those who knew him described Boy Haught as a fine looking cowboy and outdoorsman. He wore a broad brimmed hat and Levi's, was physically strong and had a pleasant personality. He embodied those Western-frontier values that were dramatized so well by his neighbor Zane Grey: an honorable reputation, dependability, honesty, fairness, and gentleness. And there was a spiritual and physical strength ready to be used when called upon.

Boy Haught died March 22, 1979, at age 84, leaving his wife and children, nine grandchildren and 12 great-grandchildren. He was buried with so many others of his clan in Payson Pioneer Cemetery. Author Marguerite Noble wrote, "With his passing went a portion of a way of life in the West, and especially in the Mogollon Rim land where he lived and helped develop the country."

References 

Census-designated places in Gila County, Arizona